The Kraai River (literally "Crow River") is a tributary of the Orange River (also called Gariep River by locals) that flows near Barkly East in the Eastern Cape, South Africa.

The river flows almost entirely over sandstone rocks of the Clarens Formation.

The Kraai is fishable, containing rainbow trout, brown trout and smallmouth yellowfish.

In 1881
a sandstone arch bridge called the J W Sauer bridge was completed over the river.  The bridge linked communities in the Kraai River basin with Aliwal North. The Sauer bridge and the Loch Bridge on the farm
Tyger Krantz, are now Provincial Heritage sites.

Major tributaries 
 Bell River and a tributary of the Bell, the Kloppershoek Spruit
 Sterk Spruit, its tributaries are the Bok Spruit and Rifle Spruit
 Joggem Spruit
 Langkloof Spruit
 Diep Spruit and its tributary, the Three Drifts Stream
 Carlisleshoek Spruit and the Maartenshoek Spruit
 Klein Wildebeest Spruit
 Saalboom Spruit and its tributary, the Vaalhoek Spruit
 Karnmelk Spruit

See also 

 List of rivers of South Africa
 List of reservoirs and dams in South Africa

References

Rivers of the Eastern Cape